Lori Jakiela is an American author of memoirs and poetry.

Education and career
Jakiela was raised in Trafford, Pennsylvania and attended Gannon University. 
She is a professor of English at the University of Pittsburgh at Greensburg, and has also taught at Chatham University and served as co-director of the Chautauqua Institution's Summer Writers Festival.

Recognition
Jakiela won Stanford University's William Saroyan International Prize for Writing for non-fiction for her third memoir, Belief Is Its Own Kind of Truth Maybe, in 2016. She was awarded a City of Asylum residency in Belgium in 2015.

She has been nominated for the Pushcart Prize.

Personal life
Jakiela has worked as a flight attendant and as a newspaper reporter. She is married to novelist Dave Newman.

Selected works

Memoir 

 Belief Is Its Own Kind of Truth, Maybe (Atticus Books, 2015; Autumn House Press, 2019)
The Bridge to Take When Things Get Serious (C&R Press, 2013)
Miss New York Has Everything (Hatchette 2006)

Essays  

Portrait of the Artist as a Bingo Worker: Essays on Work and the Writing Life (Bottom Dog Press, 2017)
Ed. by M.J. Fievre. All that Glitters: A Sliver of Stone Anthology (Lominy Books, 2013)
Ed by Sheryl St. Germain and Margaret Whitford. Between Song and Story: Essays for the 21st Century (Autumn Press House, 2011)
Ed. by Elizabeth Penfield. Short Takes: Model Essays for Composition (Pearson)
Ed. by Lee Gutkind. Keep It Real: Everything You Need to Know about Researching and Writing Creative Nonfiction (W.W. Norton, 2008)
Ed. by Dinty Moore. The Truth of the Matter: Art and Craft in Creative Nonfiction (Pearson, 2006)

Poetry 

Spot the Terrorist (Turning Point 2012)
 The Regulars (Liquid Paper Press, 2001)
 Red Eye (Pudding House, 2010)
 The Mill Hunk's Daughter Meets the Queen of Sky (Finishing Line, 2011)
 Big Fish (Stranded Oak Press, 2016)

References

External links
Official website
Faculty profile at University of Pittsburgh-Greenburg
Faculty profile at Chatham University

Year of birth missing (living people)
Living people
University of Pittsburgh faculty
21st-century American novelists
American academics of English literature
Writers from Pittsburgh
21st-century American memoirists
American women poets
American women memoirists
American women novelists
21st-century American women writers
21st-century American poets
Novelists from Pennsylvania
Poets from Pennsylvania
American women academics